Silas Mainville Burroughs (July 16, 1810 – June 3, 1860) was a U.S. Representative from New York.

Biography
Born in Ovid, New York, Burroughs completed a preparatory course. He moved to Medina, NY in 1834. He was Village Clerk of Medina, New York, in 1835; and a Village trustee in 1836, from 1839 to 1843 and from 1845 to 1847.

He studied law, was admitted to the bar in 1840, and commenced practice in Medina. He was Village Attorney of Medina from 1845 to 1847. He was a brigadier general in the New York State Militia from 1848 to 1858.

He was a member of the New York State Assembly (Orleans Co.) in 1837, 1850, 1851 and 1853.

Burroughs was elected as a Republican to the 35th and 36th United States Congresses, holding office from March 4, 1857, until his death in Medina, New York, on June 3, 1860.

When Burroughs died, he was a widower with two young children, Silas and Adeline. He is buried at the Boxwood Cemetery in Medina, NY.

Pharmaceutical entrepreneur Silas Mainville Burroughs (1846–1895) was his son.

See also
List of United States Congress members who died in office (1790–1899)

References

External links
 

1810 births
1860 deaths
People from Ovid, New York
People from Medina, New York
New York (state) lawyers
Republican Party members of the New York State Assembly
American militia generals
Republican Party members of the United States House of Representatives from New York (state)
19th-century American politicians
19th-century American lawyers